Snoop software is a command line packet analyzer included in the Solaris Operating System created by Sun Microsystems.  Its source code was available via the OpenSolaris project.

See also

Comparison of packet analyzers
Network tap

References

External links
TCP/IP and Data Communications Administration Guide
docs.sun.com:  man snoop(1M)
OpenSolaris: snoop source code

Sun Microsystems software
Network analyzers
Free network management software